WKG may stand for:

 Workington railway station, Cumbria, England, station code WKG
 Walkergate Metro station, Newcastle upon Tyne, England, station code WKG
 Kratzeburg station,  Mecklenburg-Vorpommern, Germany, DS100 code WKG
 WKG-TV, later TV station KBTR-CD